Charles François Marie Laffillé (30 September 1771 –16 April 1848) was a 19th-century French composer, poet, theatre manager and music publisher.

The son of a bailiff of the Duke of Orléans, Laffillé was tax collector of the "domaines" in Brussels during 12 years (1798–1810) before he returned to Paris where he published collections of romances and established a music publishing company.

In 1831, he was director of the Théâtre de la Monnaie in Brussels during at least one year but was forced to file for bankruptcy. Back in Paris, he continued to publish.

Some works 
 Le Souvenir des ménestrels, contenant une collection de romances inédites, Paris, 1813-1828, 16 vol.
 La Fête de l'hymen, ronde pastorale, Paris, Dentu, 1816
 Chants français, Paris, Delaunay et Dentu, 1829
 La Prise d'Alger, poème, Paris, Delaunay et Gosselin, 1834

French composers
19th-century French singers
French music publishers (people)
French theatre managers and producers
People from Saint-Valery-sur-Somme
1771 births
1848 deaths